The following list of chief rabbis of the United Hebrew Congregations of the Commonwealth gives information regarding the Chief Rabbi of the United Synagogue, which is represented through the mainstream majority Orthodox community of the United Kingdom (as the oldest and original denomination), and various other Orthodox communities located within the Commonwealth of Nations. The Chief Rabbi's full title is the "Chief Rabbi of the United Hebrew Congregations of the Commonwealth", previously "... of the British Empire". His title and position has historically, since 1758, been considered to be the Jewish community in Britain's equivalent of the Archbishop of Canterbury.

List

See also
 Chief Rabbi
 British Jews
 History of the Jews in England
 History of the Jews in Scotland
 History of the Jews in Wales
 History of the Jews in Northern Ireland

References

Further reading
 Meir Persoff, Faith Against Reason: Religious Reform and the British Chief Rabbinate 1840-1990, London: Vallentine Mitchell, 2008 
 Meir Persoff, Hats in the Ring: Choosing Britain’s Chief Rabbis from Adler to Sacks, Academic Studies Press, 2013 
 Benjamin J. Elton, Britain's Chief Rabbis and the Religious Character of Anglo-Jewry, 1880–1970, Manchester: Manchester University Press, 2009 
 Danny Rich, What is Wrong with the Chief Rabbi's Job?, Manna, Summer 2009
 Raymond Apple (2009), The British Chief Rabbinate; and other articles

Chief Rabbis
Chief Rabbis of the United Kingdom
Chief Rabbis of the United Kingdom
Chief Rabbis of the United Kingdom
Chief Rabbis of the United Kingdom
Chief Rabbis of the United Kingdom
Chief Rabbis of the United Kingdom